John De Margheriti (born July 1962) is an Italian-born Australian electrical engineer, software developer and entrepreneur. De Margheriti is widely seen as a founding 'father' of Australia's video games industry and Australia's most experienced interactive entertainment business executive.

He is the founder and former CEO of BigWorld Pty Limited and the founder of parent company Micro Forté Pty Limited. De Margheriti is also the Executive Chairman of the Academy of Interactive Entertainment, the Chairman of Canberra Technology Park, the founder of the Game Developers' Association of Australia, the founder of the Australian Game Developers Conference, and the founder of the three Canberra business parks, the co-founder of DEMS Entertainment, the co-founder of Dreamgate Studios, the co-founder of Game Plus and co-founder of The Film Distillery.

De Margheriti has been recognised as an Honorary Ambassador for Canberra due to his contribution to Australia's national capital and in 2022 was awarded the Pearcey Medal, Australia's highest honour in the ICT Industry, for his lifetime contribution to the establishment and ongoing success of the Australian games industry. Without his vision, tenacity and passion, the industry would not be as successful and vibrant as it is in now. John has effectively had an influence on just about every Australian games studio and developer in operation today, not to mention his contribution to the broader ICT community and the international games industry.

Early years
Born in Rome, Italy, De Margheriti arrived in Canberra with his family in 1970. He experimented with CB radios and electronics early as a young teenager. When he was sixteen De Margheriti experimented with making computer games independently. During his senior years at Hawker College, De Margheriti co-created an amateur  science fiction film after watching the 1977 film, Star Wars: Episode IV – A New Hope. During the development of his amateur film, he co-developed a robotics system entitled 3DIM that would enable him to film complex stop-motion animation footage of large scale spaceship models.  De Margheriti's need to create scrolling film credits led him to discover computers as a tool. The film involved dozens of actors and as a result, De Margheriti gained his first taste in management working with actors and prop builders. During filming he met Steve Wang which would later form the basis of a longstanding business association. He wrote his first computer game called “Maze” on a PDP-11 and his peer, Steve Wang developed a computer game called “Caves”, also on a PDP-11 computer.

De Margheriti graduated with a degree in electrical engineering from the UNSW Sydney (UNSW), and holds an MBA from Sydney University. Wang also went on to study at UNSW in the field of computer science. Together they devoted much of their time during university hours to developing computer games. They pooled their money to purchase a Commodore PET. During this time John also met Stephen Lewis and he joined the group, helping make games on the Commodore PET.

The most memorable game that they developed during university years was made for the Commodore 64. After a conversation with Gerlach, De Margheriti approached his friends at the university and pulled together a team including Wang, Stephen Lewis and John Reidy capable of developing the simulation game. The team spent 72 hours straight developing a demo, pitched it to Armchair Entertainment and won a contract to develop the Americas Cup Sailing Simulation game for the Commodore 64 and Amstrad which was ultimately developed and then sold to Electronic Arts.

Soon after starting to develop their first game, Wang and Lewis tactfully told De Margheriti that his true strength was not programming but managing and winning new projects for the fledgling group. This “truth” ultimately saw De Margheriti become the entrepreneur and visionary for a group of profit and not for profit companies that have offices around the globe.

In addition to the Americas Cup Sailing Simulation, De Margheriti went on to program two other of games for Electronic Arts including Demon Stalkers and Fireking for the Commodore 64 and IBM PC, which was later released by Sydney-based Strategic Studies Group. http://www.ssg.com.au/

Later career

Micro Forte Pty Limited
Between 1985 and 1988, De Margheriti turned his focus towards business negotiations and contract development. He co-founded a games development company called Micro Forté Pty Limited and wrote games for a new company called Electronic Arts.

In 1995 De Margheriti came up with the concept of developing a software solution that would somehow group bulletin board services (BBS) together so that many people could play games together. He called this concept Game Net. Game Net was a precursor to what would later become known as BigWorld Technology. De Margheriti's idea was to allow  large scale Multi User Dungeons [MUDs] to be developed where hundreds of people could be playing together in a multiplayer game. He was greatly influenced by an EA friend Danielle/Dan Bunten who had designed M.U.L.E, Modem Wars  as well as a game called Command HQ which he often played with Stephen Lewis.

Those seminal games influenced De Margheriti in terms of coming up with the concept of building what is now commonly known as Massively Multiplayer Online Games (MMOGs). While developing the idea of Game Net, De Margheriti became increasingly more aware of the advent of the internet particularly after playing Ultima Online and Meridian 59, two of the first MMOGs.

He realised that these two games were an extension of the multiplayer games he loved and that in the future many developers would want to create massively multiplayer games. De Margheriti decided to switch his focus away from BBS, and made the decision to build a middleware engine that would help developers deal with the complexities of creating these online games. In 1996 Stephen Lewis and John lodged patents for a Communication System and Method and in 1999 he lodged an application for funding through AusIndustry's R&D Start program and received a multimillion-dollar grant. This was subsequently matched by venture capital from Allen & Buckeridge, an Australian Venture capital firm. The name of “Large Scale Multi Player Universe” (LSMPU) was originally used to describe the server, client and tools middleware system that De Margheriti had in mind. In 2011 the Micro Forte company acquired all the shares from the venture capital company.

The Academy of Interactive Entertainment
In 1996, during Micro Forté's expansion years, there was a need for the hiring of 3D animators and artists. At that time there was a clear lack of knowledge in that area and little or no available talent. De Margheriti established the Academy of Interactive Entertainment (AIE) as a business unit of Micro Forté to work towards solving this problem. The academy was to focus on developing 3D animation skills, and a course taught by De Margheriti, Steve Wang and other 3D experts was created for a group of 10 students.

Later on in 1997 it was spun out as a separate non profit organisation called the Academy of Interactive Entertainment Limited (AIE) to assist the greater industry. De Margheriti had realised that Micro Forté's shortages were not just his shortages; other industry related companies like Beam Software were also suffering a similar fate. The AIE has since grown from a small division of Micro Forté with 10 students, to an independent, nationally accredited, small registered training organisation that specialises in education for computer game development and the 3D Digital Content Industry. The AIE now has campuses in Canberra, Sydney, Melbourne, Online, Adelaide, Seattle, and Lafayette.

The Founding of the Australian Game Development Industry
In 1999 De Margheriti realised that to really help the Australian games industry grow, not only for Micro Forté's needs, but to solve the problem that the nation had, a wider support infrastructure was needed for the Australian industry. He established, personally funded and launched the inaugural Australian Game Developers Conference (AGDC) to foster the growth and collective presence of the Australian Games Industry. The AGDC at its peak had over 1,200 delegates and brought in numerous international speakers and publishers. The conference also brought capital to the Australian games industry. In December 2005, the GDAA announced that it would hold its own conference, Game Connect Asia Pacific (GCAP), and so De Margheriti in turn also announced the closing of the privately held (AGDC) to ensure that the GDAA would not have to compete with AGDC.  In his AGDC closing talk he hoped that the GDAA could take their new conference, GCAP,  to a whole new level for Australia.

It was at the inaugural Australian Game Developers Conference (AGDC) that De Margheriti, along with Adam Lancman and others, formed the local industry representative body titled the Game Developers Association of Australia [GDAA] in order to increase the profile of the Australian games industry both domestically and internationally. De Margheriti acted as treasurer until late 2005 when he resigned from the Board to focus his energies on expanding BigWorld Pty Limited. De Margheriti is credited with creating and personally funding the GDAA (determining its aims and objectives, board composition, voting rights, constitution, web pages and accounting needs) as well as choosing its first President and Board. The AIE funded the Australian Game Developers Conference and donated most if not all its profits made from AGDC to the GDAA.

De Margheriti is a founding member of the Association of Christian Entertainment.

De Margheriti established Canberra Technology Park (CTP) in 1997, a business park to facilitate the growth of the computer game development, 3D animation and other information technology [IT] related industries within Canberra.

In November 2000, ACT Chief Minister, Gary Humphries, appointed De Margheriti Honorary Ambassador for Canberra in recognition of De Margheriti's contribution in assisting Canberra to develop a significant business base. De Margheriti continues to foster business growth for start ups, mentor industry rookies and support industry development. He has participated as a guest presenter at industry conferences; is pro-active in seeking government support and assistance for the Australian industry, and features in industry related media. Since 2005 De Margheriti has focused more on his growing world-wide businesses and is less involved in local industry politics.

In 2005 De Margheriti took over the site management of the Capital Region Enterprise and Employment Development Association (CREEDA) Business Centres ,  and Erindale that had gone into liquidation, with a view to negotiate a long term lease on the sites. De Margheriti's main motivation in taking over the defunct sites was to restore an important business incubator function in Australia's capital city, Canberra. The sites were re-branded as Canberra Business Parks and in May 2008, De Margheriti largely donated the CBP name [and associated brands] and business, which were now a profitable business [almost operating at full capacity] to the ACT Government and the local business community.

De Margheriti saw an opportunity within the online game market for a definitive MMOG middleware solution. His studios shifted their focus into developing the multi award-winning BigWorld Technology which he later [2002] spun out into a middleware company - BigWorld Pty Limited. On 7 August 2012 Wargaming acquired BigWorld middleware firm for $45M.

Published games

References

External links
 
 
 
 
 
 
 
 
 
 
 

Video game businesspeople
Living people
University of New South Wales alumni
1962 births